Springbank Football Club, nicknamed the Tigers, is an Australian rules football team based in the Central Highlands district of Victoria in the small town of Springbank.  The club plays in the Central Highlands Football League.

History

The team was formerly known as the  Wallace Rovers they were formed in 1925. The team played for a short time in the Dunnstown Football Association before going into recess in the mid-1930s.

Reforming and joining the Bungaree Football Association, Springbank soon had its first premiership in 1939 then again in 1940. The interruption caused by World War 2 slowed the development of football in the area. Reforming again after the war, Springbank continued in the Bungaree FA until the competition folded and unlike the other clubs that moved to the Clunes FL Springbank went into recess. 

A group of enthusiasts reformed the club in 1963 and the club entered the Clunes Football League. Success came immediately with the club winning five premierships in a row.   

Springbank's senior side has had the most successful run of all clubs since joining the Central Highlands Football League with five premierships.

Premierships
 Bungaree Football Association
 1939, 1940, 1946, 1948
 Clunes Football League
  1964, 1965, 1966, 1967, 1968, 1972
 Central Highlands Football League
 1990, 2000, 2001, 2015, 2016

VFL/AFL players
 Andrew Tranquilli - 
 Shannon Donegan - Geelong
 Andy Challis - Gold Coast Suns
 Mitch Grace - Fremantle
James Reicha - St Kilda

Bibliography
History of Football in the Ballarat District by John Stoward -

References

External links
 

Australian rules football clubs in Victoria (Australia)
Netball teams in Victoria (Australia)